The 1964 New York Jets season was the fifth season for the team in the American Football League (AFL). The season marked their first in Shea Stadium, after four seasons in the Polo Grounds. The season began with the team trying to improve on their 5–8–1 record from 1963 under head coach Weeb Ewbank. The Jets finished the season 5–8–1.

The Jets modified their helmet and logo design for 1964, switching from a single green stripe to two parallel green stripes down the center of the helmet crown. The jet-airplane logo decal was replaced by a white football shape outlined in green, with the word "JETS" in thick green sans-serif capitals over "NY" in green outline serif lettering, and a miniature football at bottom center. 

Both the Jets and the baseball New York Mets moved to Shea in 1964. The team's original owner when it was the Titans, Harry Wismer, hoped the team could play in Shea beginning in 1961, but funding difficulties and legal problems delayed construction of the stadium. Wismer signed a memorandum of understanding in late 1961 to secure the Titans' new home. That memorandum recognized that the Mets would have exclusive use of the stadium until they had completed their season. As the Jets moved to Shea under new ownership, they were, in most years, required to open the season with several road games, a problem which would become worse in 1969 and 1973 when the Mets had long playoff runs.

The Jets' popularity had reached a zenith at this point, in that the attendance at any one of their home games this season (except for one, and it wasn't by much) outdrew the Titans' entire 1962 season attendance at the Polo Grounds.

Roster

Schedule

Game summaries

Week 1

    
    
    
    
    
    
    
    

Don Maynard 4 Rec, 101 Yds

Standings

References

Bibliography

Ryczek, William J. (2009). Crash of the Titans: The Early Years of the New York Jets and the AFL (revised ed.). Jefferson, North Carolina: McFarland & Co. .

External links
1964 team stats

New York Jets seasons
New York Jets
New York Jets
1960s in Queens